is a vertically scrolling shoot 'em up developed by Psikyo and released in arcades in 1994. In the US, it was published by Jaleco. It has been re-released multiple times, including on the Sega Saturn, PlayStation, and Steam. When originally localized outside Japan by XS Games, Gunbird was retitled Mobile Light Force. The game was followed by Gunbird 2 in 1998 and was included in Gunbird Special Edition for PlayStation 2.

Gameplay

When a player collides with the body of an enemy unit, the player loses a shot power level, and a power up flies around the screen and disappears as soon as it reaches the edge. If a player is at the lowest level of shot, the player loses a bomb instead.

There are seven stages in each of the game's two loops. The first three stages are randomly chosen from possible four. In the second loop enemies fire denser bullet patterns moving at faster speeds. Stage 2-1 takes place at the only stage not available on the first loop, instead of the 1-1 counterpart. The remaining two stages are chosen at random, but does not include the replaced stage. After completing first loop with only one player, the player can choose one of two choices for a wish with a magic potion, with unique endings for each choice. If the first loop is completed with two players, a combination-specific ending is played. Each game (on default settings) begins with three lives, and an extra life is earned at 400,000 (or 600,000).

The cutscenes between the battles with two players fighting cooperatively are frequently packed with hilarious dialogue and situations. This is often a recurring theme with Psikyo games, the Gunbird games being no exception. There are no cutscenes when playing second loop stages. The Korean arcade version contains English dialog but some sound samples are missing during play.

Plot and characters
Gunbird uses manga-styled character as the player's chosen craft. A story plays out in between levels and before boss fights, telling a tale of how the protagonists are trying to collect pieces of a magic mirror to make a wish.

 Ash (アッシュ): A 28-year-old German man with a jet pack on his back, who in some of the scenes between battles is discovered to be an inventor, and when two players choose Marion and Ash as cooperative partners, he takes an unhealthy interest in her. Voiced by Ryōtarō Okiayu.
 Marion (マリオン): A 13-year-old witch from England who flies on a broomstick. She is accompanied by her talking pet rabbit, Pom-Pom, and frequently abuses the poor creature verbally and physically. Marion is fun-loving and thrill-seeking but also selfish, and has a mean streak (which Pom-Pom is often witness to). Voiced by Chiharu Tanaka.
 Valnus (バルナス): A big robot created in Russia six months ago that has some of the best firepower in the game. Secretly wishes to be human. Voiced by Kazuya Tatekabe.
Yuan Nang (ヤンニャン): A strong-willed and courageous woman whose character design is highly influenced by that of Sun Wukong from the Chinese classical story Journey to the West, including a cloud-somersault parody, Ruyi Jingu Bang, and the size-changing headband that was used by the monk Tang Sanzang. Voiced by Naoko Matsui.
 Tetsu (鉄): A strong, white-haired old man of 60 years. He is homosexual in a rather uncloseted manner and rides in a man-powered helicopter. Voiced by Sakunosuke Maya.
 The Trump (トランプ): A group of sky pirates consist of Ace (voiced by Jōji Yanami), Claud (voiced by Kazuya Tatekabe), and their female leader Rouge (voiced by Noriko Ohara). They are not playable and serve as the players' rivals in the story.

Development and release 
The game was displayed at the PlayStation Expo '96 in Tokyo. There it was shown off alongside another vertically scrolling shooting game, Stahlfeder by developer Santos.

The game was released in Japan for the PlayStation and Sega Saturn on December 15, 1995.

The game was released in North America as Mobile Light Force for the PlayStation. All in-game plot in this version, including the game's ending, was removed and character names were changed to those of XS Games employees. The game featured a Charlie's Angels-style cover picture, completely unrelated to the original characters or the game's theme. The original's fan art gallery was also removed from the game, although the directories are still intact on the disc if inserted into a PC.

Gunbird Special Edition was a version of the game was based on an arcade version, and included the sequel, Gunbird 2. It was released only for the PlayStation 2 in 2004–2005.

Gunbird was included in Psikyo Collection Vol. 1 along with Strikers 1945, Samurai Aces and Sol Divide.

In 2022, the original arcade version will be included as part of the Sega Astro City Mini V, a vertically-oriented variant of the Sega Astro City mini console.

Reception
In Japan, Game Machine listed Gunbird on their November 15, 1994 issue as being the ninth most-successful table arcade unit of the month.

Gunbird received mostly positive reviews. Weekly Famitsu gave the PlayStation version a 29 out of 40 score. An import version for the Sega Saturn earned good scores of 82% from and 80% from French magazines Consoles + and Mega Force. The three reviewers from the Japanese Sega Saturn Magazine rated it 6, 8 and 9 out of 10.

References

External links

Gunbird at the International Arcade Museum
Detailed Gunbird info at the World of Arcades
Mobile Light Force at MobyGames

1994 video games
Arcade video games
City Connection franchises
Video games set in the 1910s
Cooperative video games
PlayStation (console) games
PlayStation Network games
Psikyo games
Sega Saturn games
Science fantasy video games
Steampunk video games
Vertically scrolling shooters
Video games developed in Japan
Video games featuring female protagonists
Video games about witchcraft
Jaleco games
XS Games games
Multiplayer and single-player video games
Atlus games